Svenska Akademien is a Swedish reggae band formed in 1999 by Carl-Martin Vikingsson, Simon Vikokel and Kristoffer Hellman. Since the band dissolved in 2009, Carl-Martin Vikingsson has released two solo albums as "Sture Alléns Dansorkester". Svenska Akademien vocalist and toaster Ivan Olausson-Klatil aka "General Knas" has released three solo albums, the first one in June 2006 called "Äntligen har rika människor fått det bättre" ("Finally rich people's conditions have improved") and the latest one in 2012, called "Kärlek & Revolt" ("Love & Rebellion").

Although some people consider their music to be politically green and leftish, they have stated on their website that "Svenska Akademien doesn't have its own ideology, or some kind of manifest approved by its members."

On 1 February 2013 it was announced that Svenska Akademien would make a comeback, with an upcoming album and new tour dates.

Discography
 2001 Snapphaneklanen (EP)
 2002 Med anledning av
 2004 Tändstickor för mörkrädda
 2005 Resa sig opp
 2005 Upphovsmännen till den skånska raggan (compilation album)
 2007 Gör det ändå!

Singles
 2001 Snapphaneklanen
 2002 Rötter
 2004 Psalm för mörkrädda
 2005 Du vill så du kan
 2007 Vakna

Members
 Kenneth Björklund
 Ivan Olausson-Klatil aka General Knas
 Agnes Olsson
 Johan Pettersson aka Räven
 Lars Thörnblom
 Carl-Martin Vikingsson aka Sture Allén d.y.
 Simon Vikokel aka Don Cho

References

External links

Swedish hip hop groups
Swedish reggae musicians